Antonios Gioulbas (also Antonios Gkioulmpas, ; born April 17, 1986) is a Greek former swimmer, who specialized in backstroke events. Gioulbas qualified for the men's 200 m backstroke at the 2004 Summer Olympics in Athens, representing the host nation Greece. He cleared a FINA B-standard entry time of 2:01.35 from a test event at the Athens Olympic Aquatic Centre. He challenged seven other swimmers on the third heat, including top medal favorite Tomomi Morita of Japan. He touched out Spain's Aschwin Wildeboer to take a seventh spot by 0.03 of a second in 2:04.30. Gioulbas failed to advance into the semifinals, as he placed twenty-eighth overall in the preliminaries.

References

External links
2004 Olympic Profile – Eideisis Ellinika 

1986 births
Living people
Greek male swimmers
Olympic swimmers of Greece
Swimmers at the 2004 Summer Olympics
Male backstroke swimmers
Swimmers from Athens